DniproAzot located in Kamianske, Dnipropetrovsk Oblast is an enterprise in the chemical industry of Ukraine. DniproAzot is a significant producer of ammonia, nitrogen fertilizers,  urea, caustic soda, chlorine,  and hydrochloric acid. DniproAzot is one of the five largest chemical enterprises in the country. In May 2018, the company celebrated its 80th anniversary.

See also
Odesa Port Plant (Chemical)
Azot (Cherkasy)
Sumykhimprom
Rivneazot

References

Companies established in 1938
Privat Group
Chemical companies of Ukraine